Christoph Meinel (born April 14, 1954 in Meißen, Germany) is a German computer scientist and professor of Internet technologies and systems at the Hasso Plattner Institute (HPI) of the University of Potsdam. He is the scientific director and CEO of the HPI and has developed the openHPI learning platform with more than 1 million enrolled learners. In 2019, he was appointed to the New Internet IPv6 Hall of Fame.

Professional life 
Meinel studied mathematics and computer science at the Humboldt-University of Berlin from 1974 to 1979, received his doctorate (Dr. rer. nat.) there in 1981, on questions of complexity theory, and habilitated (Dr. sc. nat.) in 1988, with the paper Modified branching programs and their computational power. After German reunification, he held visiting positions at the universities of Saarbrücken and Paderborn.

From 1992 to 2004, he was Professor of Theoretical Concepts and New Applications in Computer Science at the University of Trier. From 1996 to 2002, he was founding director of the Institute for Telematics e. V. in Trier, which, under the supervision of the Fraunhofer Society, dealt with issues in the field of Internet and Web technologies. From 1995 to 2007, he was a member of the scientific board of directors of the International Meeting and Research Center for Computer Science IBFI Schloss Dagstuhl. He was Visiting Professor and Senior Research Fellow at the University of Luxembourg (2002–2010), is Honorary Professor at the School of Computer Sciences at Beijing University of Technology, and Visiting Professor at the Universities of Shanghai and Dalian.

Since 2004, Meinel has been Institute Director and CEO of the Hasso Plattner Institute for Digital Engineering gGmbH (HPI) in Potsdam and holds the Chair of Internet Technologies and Systems. From 2017 to 2021, he was founding dean of the Faculty of Digital Engineering at the University of Potsdam. Meinel is a member of acatech, the German National Academy of Science and Engineering, and serves on the Board of Governors of the Technion in Haifa, among many other academic bodies. He is a teacher at the HPI School of Design Thinking and on the MOOC platform openHPI.

Research focus 
Christoph Meinel's work initially focused on theoretical computer science, and here on complexity theory and binary decision diagrams. Later, he worked on Internet technologies, IT security, and digital education and new forms of teaching and learning on the Internet, such as tele-teaching and e-learning with tele-TASK and openHPI. He then conducted research on information and Internet security issues, such as the high-security network protection Lock-Keeper, protection against unwanted and offensive content, and security in service-based architectures with applications in telemedicine. He is also scientifically engaged in knowledge management issues on the Internet and new forms of Internet-based teaching and learning tele-TASK. In 2008–2022, together with Larry Leifer he was program director of the HPI-Stanford Design Thinking Research Program (HPDTRP). 

The first European MOOCs platform openHPI, which Meinel initiated and developed under his leadership, offers free interactive online courses on topics related to digital education and technologies. More than 1 million learners from around the world are enrolled and can also earn qualified certificates for successful completion of online courses. In the process, the identity of course participants is verified via webcam and online learning opportunities and certifications are given weight. The openHPI platform is now also used by other partners, such as openWHO, openSAP, LERNEN.cloud, KI-Campus or eGov-Campus. 

Meinel is also involved in the area of digital education in schools and chairs nationwide working groups that develop concepts and secure digital working environments for learning in the future. The "Bildungscloud" and in particular the HPI Schul-Cloud enables a low-threshold and data protection-compliant access to digital educational offerings in German schools. The HPI Schul-Cloud, which was funded by the German federal ministry of education and Research BMBF and developed under Meinel's leadership in the years 2016–2021, is now operated by Dataport AöR and is in use in many thousands of schools in all German states, especially Thuringia, Brandenburg and Lower Saxony. Students and teachers can use it to access digital teaching resources in the classroom, communicate digitally, securely store and exchange texts, presentations and data, and access educational software from the Internet pseudonymously. 

Meinel holds several international patents (for example Lock-Keeper) and has developed, among others, the tele-teaching system tele-TASK, the online collaboration tool Tele-Board or the very popular ID-Leak-Checker service.

Publishing and editorial work 
Meinel is author, co-author, or editor of 25 textbooks. Among these are "Blogoshere and its Exploration",
"Internetworking",
"Digitale Kommunikation",
"WWW – Kommunikation, Internetworking, Web-Technologien",
"Design Thinking – Innovation lernen, Ideenwelten öffnen",
"Mathematische Grundlagen der Informatik",
"Algorithmen und Datenstrukturen im VLSI-Design. OBDDs – Grundlagen und Anwendungen",
and of various conference proceedings.

Meinel has published more than 700 per-reviewed scientific papers in international scientific journals and conferences. He holds various international patents (e.g. Lock-Keeper, tele-TASK, and Teleboard). 

Meinel is editor of the book series Understanding Innovation published by Springer-Verlag, the scientific online journals ECCC and ECDTR, the Internet-Bridge Germany-China. In 1994, he was the initiator and co-founder of the online journal on complexity theory ECCC – Electronic Colloquium on Computational Complexity and its editor-in-chief until 2016.

MOOCs and Teleteaching 
Many lectures and lecture series' of Christoph Meinel are recorded and freely accessible on the Internet via the tele-TASK portal. In 2012 his team designed the first European MOOC platform openHPI which provides many free online courses in the field of IT-technologies. He also offers various massive open online courses, for example on Blockchains, Internet Security for Beginners, Internet and Web Technologies with about 10.000 enrolled learners each. As a chairman of various Cloud-Learning initiatives Christoph Meinel leads innovations in the field of the digital transformation of the German schools and education sector. With projects such as "Bildungscloud" and "Schul-Cloud" he promote the use of digital media in schools and other educational instances.

References

External links 
 Personal Homepage
 Hasso-Plattner-Institut, Potsdam, Germany
 List of Publications on the DBLP-Server
 MOOCs platform of HPI
 tele-TASK portal - archive of more than 5.000 lecture videos
 German IPv6 Council
 ECDTR - The Electronic Colloqium on Design Thinking Research

Living people
Academic staff of the University of Potsdam
20th-century German inventors
German computer scientists
1954 births
German male writers